There is also Rua Serpa Pinto in the neighbourhood of Mártires in Lisbon, Portugal

Rua Serpa Pinto (formerly Rua do Lencastre) is a street in the Plateau, the historic centre of Praia, Santiago island, Cape Verde. It is one of the main arteries of the city centre. Formerly named Rua do Lencastre after early 19th century Portuguese governor António Lencastre, it was renamed in honour of Alexandre de Serpa Pinto, Portuguese colonial administrator. It runs south to north in the central part of the Plateau, parallel to Rua 5 de Julho and Avenida Andrade Corvo. It forms the east side of Praça Alexandre Albuquerque and the west side of Praça Luís de Camões.

Notable buildings along the street:
Presidential Palace (Palácio Presidencial)
Pro-Cathedral of Our Lady of Grace, at Praça Alexandre Albuquerque
Escola Grande, at Praça Luís de Camões
the Nazarene church, built in 1947
Liceu Domingos Ramos, at Praça Domingos Ramos

References

Plateau of Praia
Streets in Praia